Tõnu Viik (born 12 December 1939, in Rohuneeme) is an Estonian astronomer.

From 2008 to 2014 he was the president of Estonian Naturalists' Society.

In 2000, he was awarded with Order of the White Star, III class.

References

Living people
1939 births
Estonian astronomers
Recipients of the Order of the White Star, 3rd Class
University of Tartu alumni
Academic staff of the University of Tartu
People from Viimsi Parish